Spark's Fort was a pioneer blockhouse in Pennsylvania, erected on the southern side of the Youghiogheny River, near Burn's Ford as early as 1774. It was first used as a polling place on July 8, 1776.

References

Forts in Pennsylvania
Colonial forts in Pennsylvania
Buildings and structures in Fayette County, Pennsylvania
Demolished buildings and structures in Pennsylvania
Polling places
1770s establishments in Pennsylvania